The Right to Live is a 1933 British crime film directed by Albert Parker and starred Davy Burnaby, Pat Paterson and Francis L. Sullivan. It was made at Ealing Studios as a quota quickie by the British subsidiary of Fox Film.

Premise
A shady financier tries to acquire a new chemical.

Cast
Davy Burnaby as Sir George Kessler
Pat Paterson as June Kessler
Richard Bird as Richard Fulton
Francis L. Sullivan as Roger Stoneham
Lawrence Anderson as Hugh Latimer
Frank Atkinson as Harry Woods

References

Bibliography
 Chibnall, Steve. Quota Quickies: The Birth of the British 'B' Film. British Film Institute, 2007.
 Low, Rachael. Filmmaking in 1930s Britain. George Allen & Unwin, 1985.
 Wood, Linda. British Films, 1927-1939. British Film Institute, 1986.

External links

1933 films
1933 crime films
British black-and-white films
Films directed by Albert Parker
British crime films
1930s English-language films
1930s British films
Quota quickies
Ealing Studios films
Fox Film films